Tetrad ('group of 4') or tetrade may refer to:

 Tetrad (area), an area 2 km x 2 km square
 Tetrad (astronomy), four total lunar eclipses within two years
 Tetrad (chromosomal formation)
 Tetrad (general relativity), or frame field
 Tetrad formalism, an approach to general relativity 
 Tetrad (geometry puzzle), a set of four simply connected disjoint planar regions in the plane
 Tetrad (meiosis), the four cells produced by meiotic cell division
 Tetrad (music), a set of four notes
 Tetrad (chord), a series of four notes
 Tetrad (symbol), or tetractys, a triangular figure of ten points arranged in four rows, and mystical symbol
 Medical tetrad, a group of four signs or symptoms which characterise a specific medical condition
 Nibble, or tetrade, a 4-bit group
 a tuple of length 4
 Tetrad Islands, in the Antarctic

See also 
 
 4
 Triad (disambiguation) ('group of 3')
 Pentad (disambiguation) ('group of 5')
 Dark tetrad, group of four undesirable personality traits
 Tetrad of media effects, a pedagogical tool
 Tetromino, a shape composed of four squares